Fashion Square or Fashion Square Mall may refer to any of the following shopping malls in the United States:

Charlottesville Fashion Square in Charlottesville, Virginia
Fashion Square Mall in Saginaw, Michigan
Orlando Fashion Square in Orlando, Florida
Scottsdale Fashion Square in Scottsdale, Arizona
Westfield Fashion Square, formerly Sherman Oaks Fashion Square, in Sherman Oaks, California